Maradana fuscolimbalis is a species of snout moth. It is found on Sardinia and Malta and in Tunisia.

The wingspan is about 19 mm.

References

Moths described in 1888
Pyralini
Moths of Europe